Netta is a genus of diving ducks. The name is derived from Greek Netta "duck". Unlike other diving ducks, the Netta species are reluctant to dive, and feed more like dabbling ducks.

These are gregarious ducks, mainly found on fresh water. They are strong fliers; their broad, blunt-tipped wings require faster wing-beats than those of many ducks and they take off with some difficulty.

They do not walk as well on land as the dabbling ducks because their legs tend to be placed further back on their bodies to help propel them when underwater.

The probably extinct pink-headed duck, previously listed as Rhodonessa caryophyllacea, has recently been shown by phylogenetic analysis to be closely related to the red-crested pochard, so has now been transferred to the same genus, as Netta caryophyllacea. However, this has been questioned due to numerous and pronounced peculiarities of that species.

Species
There are 3 recognized species.

References

External links

 
Bird genera
Taxa named by Johann Jakob Kaup